The 2010 FA Community Shield (also known as The FA Community Shield sponsored by McDonald's for sponsorship reasons) was the 88th FA Community Shield, an annual football match contested by the winners of the previous season's Premier League and FA Cup competitions. The match was played at Wembley Stadium, London, on 8 August 2010, and contested by league and cup double winners Chelsea and league runners-up Manchester United. Manchester United won the match 3–1 with goals from Antonio Valencia, Javier Hernández and Dimitar Berbatov; Chelsea's consolation goal came from Salomon Kalou. It was Manchester United's 14th outright victory in the Community Shield.

Chelsea went into the match as trophy-holders, having won the 2009 Community Shield. The Shield is usually contested by the winners of the Premier League and the FA Cup, but since Chelsea won the double, Manchester United qualified by default as Premier League runners-up. It was the third time in four years that the Community Shield had been contested between the two teams.

Match details

See also
 2009–10 Premier League
 2009–10 FA Cup

References

2010
Community Shield
Fa Community Shield
Fa Community Shield
Charity Shield 2010
Charity Shield 2010
Events at Wembley Stadium